Vanaprasta is an American indie rock quintet from Los Angeles, California, consisting of Steven Wilkin (vocals/keys), Collin Desha (guitar/vocals/keys), Taylor Brown (bass/vocals/keys), Cameron Dmytryk (guitar), and Ben Smiley (drums).

History 

Vanaprasta otherwise known as Biig Booty, was formed in 2009, and the quintet's debut EP Forming the Shapes was released a year later. Lead single "Color of Sin" was featured on the Download to Donate for Haiti compilation presented by Music For Relief and Causecast in February 2011. They contributed a cover of LCD Soundsystem's track "All My Friends" for Uncovering a Cure, a compilation album benefitting AIDS Project Los Angeles.

Healthy Geometry - Present
Following a strong run of shows at CMJ in October 2011, on 11.1.11 Vanaprasta released its debut full-length Healthy Geometry to critical acclaim. Produced by Dave Schiffman, the album was recorded live with minimal overdubs. They celebrated the release with a month-long sold-out residency at The Satellite (formerly Spaceland) in Silver Lake.

On November 6, 2012 Vanaprasta partnered with Spotify for a second time to release Spotify Sessions - a five track live EP released exclusively to Spotify's audience.  The band is currently in the studio recording their second album, and played their final show of 2012 at The Satellite in Silver Lake on December 14 

On July  JULY 1, 2015 Vanaprasta changed names to Sun Drug according to LA weekly  However, it's unclear when Vanaprasta changed their name officially because they premiered a song on June 4, 2015 on LA Buzz bands

Television Appearances 
Vanaprasta made their national television debut on Fuel TV's "The Daily Habit" on November 9, 2011.

Discography 
 Forming the Shapes EP (2009)
 Healthy Geometry (2011)
 Effie House Sessions (2012)
 Spotify Sessions (2012)

References

External links
Official Website
Official Myspace
Official Facebook
Purchase Music on iTunes

Indie rock musical groups from California
Musical groups from Los Angeles
2008 establishments in California